"A Cowboy's Work is Never Done" is a song by pop duo Sonny and Cher from their album All I Ever Need Is You, written by Sonny Bono. It was released as a single in 1972 and peaked at No. 8 on the US Billboard Hot 100. Billboard ranked it at No. 71 on the 1972 year-end singles chart.

Song information
The song was Sonny and Cher's last top ten hit together in the United States. When Cher performed it on their successful television show, with their cartoon music video produced by John David Wilson, Cher's solo career was booming. The track can be heard in the 2005 film Be Cool, and also the 2010 Documentary Blood Into Wine. Allmusic highlighted the song.

Weekly charts

Year-end charts

Cover versions
In 2012, on Diego's Umbrella's fourth album, Proper Cowboy.
In 2018, by Mandy Barnett on her album, "Strange Conversation".

References

Songs about cowboys and cowgirls
1972 singles
Songs written by Sonny Bono
Sonny & Cher songs
Song recordings produced by Snuff Garrett
1972 songs
MCA Records singles